Ticknor, a variant spelling of Tickner, is a topographic surname of English origin for someone who lived at a crossroad or a fork in the road. Notable people with the surname include:

 Anna Eliot Ticknor (1823–1896), American author and educator
 Ben Ticknor (1909–1979), American football player
 Duane Ticknor, assistant basketball coach for the Sacramento Kings
 Elisha Ticknor (1757–1821), educator and merchant, father of Boston author George Ticknor
 Francis Orray Ticknor, country doctor, poet, and man of letters
 George Ticknor (1791–1871), American academician and Hispanist
 George Ticknor (journalist) (1822–1866), lawyer, and later a journalist
 George Ticknor Curtis (1812–1894), American author, writer, historian and lawyer
 William Ticknor (1810–1864), American publisher in Boston, Massachusetts, USA
 Ticknor and Fields, American publishing company based in Boston, Massachusetts
 William Davis Ticknor, Sr. (1881–1938), American businessman

See also 
 
 Tichenor
 Amory-Ticknor House, historic house in Boston, Massachusetts
 Dr. Benajah Ticknor House, historical museum in Ann Arbor Michigan

References 

English-language surnames